Kharkiv International Airport  is an airport located in Kharkiv, Ukraine. It is the main airfield serving the city of Kharkiv, Ukraine's second largest city. It is located to the south-east of the city center, in the city's Slobidskyi district.

On 24 February 2022, Ukraine closed airspace to civilian flights due to Russian invasion of Ukraine.

History
The old terminal at Kharkiv was built in the 1950s employing a neoclassical style. However, with the selection of Poland and Ukraine to co-host the 2012 UEFA European Football Championship, a new modern international terminal was built in order to comply with UEFA regulations. The old building was renovated to become a VIP terminal.

Since 2013, the airport operates a CATII instrument landing system (ILS).

Airlines and destinations

The following airlines operate regular scheduled and charter flights at the airport:

As of 24 February 2022, all passenger flights have been suspended indefinitely.

Statistics

Ground transport
Kharkiv International Airport is well served by municipal transport and is connected to the city's wider network of roads and railways via Aeroflotska Street and the M03 national trunk road. The following bus lines provide public transportation between the airport and the city of Kharkiv:

 Trolleybus 5 — Airport to Universitetska Street via Prospekt Haharina metro station
 115 — Airport to Prospekt Haharina metro station
 119 — Airport to Prospekt Peremohy via Prospekt Haharina metro station
 152 — Airport to Mikroraion 552 via Akademika Barabashova metro station
 225 — Airport to Akademika Barabashova metro station, transfer to Akademika Barabashova metro station

See also
 List of airports in Ukraine
 List of the busiest airports in Ukraine
 List of the busiest airports in Europe
 List of the busiest airports in the former USSR

References

External links 

  
 NOAA/NWS current weather observation
 ASN Accident history for UKHH

Airports in Ukraine
Transport in Kharkiv
Airports built in the Soviet Union
Buildings and structures in Kharkiv
Slobidskyi District